Cuyahoga River Bridge #1, also known as the Iron Curtain Bridge and previously known as the First Flats Rail Bridge, is a railroad bridge lift bridge that crosses the Cuyahoga River in Cleveland, Ohio, United States. The bridge gets its "number 1" name from the fact that it is the farthest downstream crossing of the Cuyahoga River proper before it empties into Lake Erie (the only other crossing is the Old River Bridge, which crosses the former course of the Cuyahoga). The bridge is of similar design to many of the other railroad bridges in the Cleveland area.

See also
List of crossings of the Cuyahoga River

References

External links 

 Description at historicbridges.org

Bridges in Cleveland
Wrought iron bridges in the United States
Railroad bridges in Ohio
Truss bridges in the United States
Vertical lift bridges in the United States
Bridges over the Cuyahoga River